The President of the Church is the highest office of the Church of Jesus Christ of Latter-day Saints (LDS Church). It was the office held by Joseph Smith, the church's founder. The church's president is its leader and the head of the First Presidency, its highest governing body. Latter-day Saints consider the president of the church to be a "prophet, seer, and revelator" and refer to him as "the Prophet", a title that was originally given to Smith. When the name of the president is used by adherents, it is usually prefaced by the title "President". Russell M. Nelson has been the president since January 14, 2018.

Latter-day Saints consider the church's president to be God's spokesman to the entire world and the highest priesthood authority on earth, with the exclusive right to receive revelations from God on behalf of the entire church or the entire world.

The President of the Church serves as the head of both the Council on the Disposition of the Tithes and the Council of the Church. The President of the Church also serves as the ex officio chairman of the Church Boards of Trustees/Education.

History

Joseph Smith

The concept that the Church of Christ would have a single presiding officer arose in late 1831. Initially, after the church's formation on April 6, 1830, Joseph Smith referred to himself as "an apostle of Jesus Christ, and elder of the church". However, there was another apostle, Oliver Cowdery, and several other elders of the church, making the formal hierarchy of the church unclear.

In September 1830, after Hiram Page said he had received revelations for the church, a revelation to Smith stated that "no one shall be appointed to receive commandments and revelations in this church excepting my servant Joseph Smith, Jun., for he receiveth them even as Moses." That established Smith's exclusive right to lead the church.

In early June 1831, Smith was ordained to the "high priesthood," along with twenty-two other men, including prominent figures in the church such as Hyrum Smith, Parley P. Pratt, and Martin Harris. As "high priests", they were higher in the priesthood hierarchy than the elders of the church. However, it was still unclear whether Smith's and Cowdery's callings as apostles gave them superior authority to that of other high priests.

On November 11, 1831, a revelation to Smith stated that "it must needs be that one be appointed of the high priesthood to preside over the Priesthood and he shall be called President of the high priesthood of the Church... and again the duty of the President of the high priesthood is to preside over the whole church". Smith was ordained to that position and sustained by the church on January 25, 1832, at a conference in Amherst, Ohio.

In 1835, the "Articles and Covenants of the Church of Christ" were revised, changing the phrase "an... elder of the church" to "the first elder of this Church". Thus, after 1835, Smith was sometimes referred to as the "First Elder" of the church. The 1835 revision also added a verse that referred to the office of "president of the high priesthood (or presiding elder)", which had since been added to the church hierarchy.

Succession crisis

In 1844, in jail awaiting trial for treason charges, Joseph Smith was killed by an armed mob. Hyrum Smith, his presumed successor, was killed in the same incident. Smith had not indisputably established who was next in line as successor to President of the Church. Several claimants to the role of church president emerged during the succession crisis that ensued.

Before a large meeting convened to discuss the succession in Nauvoo, Illinois, Sidney Rigdon, the senior surviving member of the church's First Presidency, argued there could be no successor to the deceased prophet and that he should be made the "Protector" of the church. Brigham Young opposed that reasoning and motion, as Smith had earlier recorded a revelation, which stated the Quorum of the Twelve Apostles was "equal in authority and power" to the First Presidency, so Young claimed that the leadership of the church fell to the Twelve Apostles. Most who were in attendance were persuaded that the Quorum of the Twelve Apostles should lead the church and Young was sustained as "the president of the quorum of the Twelve and first presidency of the church," thereby assuming leadership of the church. However, Young was not ordained President of the Church at the time.

Later developments
On December 27, 1847, three-and-a-half years after Smith's death, Young was ordained the President of the Church. At the time, seniority was determined by the first date of ordination as an apostle.  By that definition, Heber C. Kimball was the most senior. However, since he was called to the First Presidency, Orson Hyde, who was the next most senior apostle became the President of the Quorum. In 1869, Brigham Young changed the order of the seniority, placing Brigham Young Jr., who was the most recently called member of the Quorum, ahead of Joseph F. Smith. Smith had been in the Quorum longer, but Young Jr. had been an apostle longer. In 1875, Young changed the definition of seniority to be determined by the longest continuous term as an apostle.  Since Orson Hyde and Orson Pratt had been temporarily removed from the apostleship during Nauvoo, they were removed from their position and placed in seniority, based on when they were reinstated as an apostle.  That gave John Taylor the highest seniority, since Kimball had died.  When Young died in 1877, Taylor assumed leadership instead of Hyde.  Wilford Woodruff, explained in 1879, "Elder Taylor is the oldest in Ordination and that is why he presides today." The First Presidency was dissolved, and the previous members were ordained as counselors to the Twelve. Other men were called to fill the vacancies in the Quorum. When Taylor died, the pattern changed, and the members of the First Presidency rejoined the Quorum based on their seniority. Two years later, Wilford Woodruff was ordained as President of the Church and Lorenzo Snow was the President of the Quorum.

When Woodruff died, his counselors returned to the Quorum based on the date they were ordained an apostle, placing George Q. Cannon and Joseph F. Smith below Brigham Young Jr. and John Willard Young. Heber J. Grant objected to that arguing that seniority should be based on ordination to the Quorum rather than ordination as an apostle. Young argued that an apostle should not be demoted as long as he is worthy of the position. On March 31, 1900, Snow met with his counselors, Cannon and Smith, and decided to change the policy to gauge seniority based on entrance to the Quorum, rather than ordination as an apostle. Part of the reasoning was the ordination of Brigham Young Jr was done privately by his father, Brigham Young, without the members voting on the ordination.  That put Cannon and Smith ahead of both Brigham Young Jr. and John Willard Young. However, Brigham Young Jr. maintained his position as President of the Quorum. Before Snow died, he instructed Smith not to wait to reorganize the First Presidency, which gave no time to John Willard Young to object.  From then on, apostles were not ordained without also being called to the Quorum.

On November 23, 1918, Anthon H. Lund, the most senior apostle, was called to serve in the First Presidency. Rather than give up his title as President of the Quorum, as had been done earlier, he maintained his title, and Rudger Clawson was given the title of Acting President of the Quorum of the Twelve Apostles. That pattern is the pattern that is followed today.

LDS Church president

Current
Following the January 2, 2018, death of the 16th church president, Thomas S. Monson, Russell M. Nelson was ordained and set apart on January 14, 2018, as the church's 17th president. In an unprecedented move, Nelson was introduced as the new church president by D. Todd Christofferson, the senior apostle on the Church Public Affairs Committee on January 16, 2018, in a broadcast originating from the annex of the Salt Lake Temple.  Nelson then introduced his counselors and the new leadership of the Quorum of the Twelve Apostles. That introduction was followed with a traditional press conference, which has been typical for new church presidents and their counselors since being originated in 1973 with new church president Spencer W. Kimball.

Succession to the presidency

In the LDS Church, when a president of the church dies, the First Presidency is dissolved, and the members of the First Presidency who were formerly members of the Quorum of the Twelve Apostles rejoin it. The Quorum of the Twelve, which may number greater than twelve with the returning members from the First Presidency, then becomes the presiding council of the church, with the senior apostle as its president. (Seniority is determined by the time since joining the Quorum, not by age.) The President of the Quorum of the Twelve becomes the highest-ranking official in the church and has always become the next church president. However, the appointment is not made official until the Quorum of the Twelve meets and selects the next president of the church.

Since the late 19th century, the Quorum of the Twelve has moved quickly to reconstitute the First Presidency within days or weeks of the late church president's death. However, Brigham Young presided over the church for three years as the President of the Quorum of the Twelve before the First Presidency was reconstituted after the death of Joseph Smith. The tradition of waiting for two to three years before selecting a new president continued until the 1898 death of the fourth president of the church, Wilford Woodruff. Since then, the surviving apostles have typically met in the Salt Lake Temple on the Sunday following the late president's funeral, to select and set apart the next president of the church (that was done in 1973, and described in detail by N. Eldon Tanner to Brigham Young University students in 1978). At the next regularly scheduled general conference, the membership of the church have the opportunity of sustaining their new leader by common consent, at a special conference session referred to as a "solemn assembly".

Seniority in the Quorum of the Twelve Apostles
Seniority in the Quorum of the Twelve Apostles is important, as the senior apostle presides over the Quorum and usually becomes the president of the church after the current president's death. Specific rules have been applied to unusual situations that have arisen over time, including a member being removed from the quorum by disfellowshipment or excommunication and later being restored to the quorum. It was decided that, the removed apostle then loses his seniority in the quorum.

For example, Brigham Young decided that John Taylor was to be President of the Twelve and Wilford Woodruff would follow him in seniority because of the readmission to the quorum of Orson Hyde, who had been disfellowshipped in 1846, and Orson Pratt, who had been excommunicated in 1842. Young ruled in 1875 that when Hyde and Pratt rejoined the quorum, they became the newest junior members of the quorum and their previous service was not considered when calculating quorum seniority. Later, whether or not an apostle was a member of the Quorum and when the apostle was added as a member of the Quorum became an important factor. For example, following the death of Lorenzo Snow, John Willard Young (ordained 1855 but never in the Quorum) became the senior apostle, and Brigham Young, Jr. (ordained 1864 and added to the Quorum 1868), the senior apostle serving in the Quorum. However, on April 5, 1900, the First Presidency and Quorum of the Twelve unanimously decided that the date an individual became a member of the Quorum of the Twelve was the relevant date for succession purposes, not the date an individual was ordained as an apostle. Thus, Joseph F. Smith (ordained apostle 1866 and added to the quorum 1867) became president of the church in 1901, since he was the living apostle who had become a member of the Quorum of the Twelve at the earliest date.

In another instance, Ezra Taft Benson left active status in the quorum for a time when he was serving as the United States Secretary of Agriculture in the Eisenhower administration. However, Benson did not lose seniority in the Quorum, and he became the president of the church upon the death of Spencer W. Kimball.

If the President of the Quorum of the Twelve has been called to be a counselor in the First Presidency, the most senior apostle not in the First Presidency is set apart and referred to as the Acting President of the Quorum of the Twelve Apostles. At the death of the president of the church, the Acting President of the Quorum of the Twelve retains his position in the quorum's membership, and the President of the Quorum of the Twelve takes his role as President of the Quorum.

Establishing doctrine, infallibility, and opinion

When the church president is speaking in his official capacity, his words are not considered "infallible". Members of the church are considered not fully justified in their actions if they "blindly" follow the president. The church has counseled its members that they should reject statements that contradict what is found in church scriptures "regardless of the position of the man who says it". Instructions given or positions taken by the president of the church can be changed by a future president of the church because of the Latter-day Saint belief in "continuing revelation". It is accepted that a church president will occasionally revise or clarify instructions of past church presidents. One apostle of the church counseled to "beware of those who would pit the dead prophets against the living prophets, for the living prophets always take precedence".

Not everything said by the prophet is considered to be doctrine. Joseph Smith taught that "a prophet is a prophet only when he was acting as such". When the church president declares new doctrine, "he will declare it as revelation from God, and it will be so accepted by the Council of the Twelve and sustained by the body of the Church". If the doctrine is not accepted by the church as the word of God, members are not bound by it, even if it comes from the President of the Church.

When the president of the church speaks, it is not always in his official capacity. The president may offer opinion and conjecture about topics that may or may not be church doctrine or inspired by God. It may be difficult to know when the president of the church is speaking in his capacity as such and when he is offering personal opinion. Most Latter-day Saints assume that statements made by the president in sermons at a church general conference or other formal church meeting would constitute statements made in the capacity of church president. However, even then, the president may explicitly indicate that he is expressing only a personal opinion. However, because of the accepted principle that a prophet's teachings need not include the declaration "thus saith the Lord" to be considered binding, individual members of the church may feel cultural pressure to follow suggestions from the president of the church, just as if they were commandments.

Presidents of the church have taught that God will never allow the president to lead the Latter-day Saints astray and that God will "remove" any man who stands at the head of the church who intends to mislead its members. That is not a statement of belief that they are "infallible" but that their errors will not result in "the permanent injury of the work". Thus, the current prophet can clarify, correct, or change any previous teachings.

Counselors

When a new president of the church is selected, he chooses counselors to assist him. Most presidents have had a minimum of two counselors, but circumstances have occasionally required more than two. For example, David O. McKay had five counselors during the final years of his presidency and at one point, Brigham Young had eight. Counselors are usually chosen from among the members of the Quorum of the Twelve Apostles, but there have been a number of exceptions where members of the church's Presiding Bishopric or persons from the church at large were called to be counselors. Any high priest of the church is eligible to be called as a counselor in the First Presidency. There have also been a few cases of counselors being ordained to the priesthood office of apostle and becoming members of the Quorum of the Twelve after they had been chosen as counselors in the First Presidency, like J. Reuben Clark. There have been other cases of counselors being ordained to the office of apostle but not set apart as a member of the Quorum of the Twelve, such as Alvin R. Dyer. Other counselors in the First Presidency were never ordained to the office of apostle, such as Charles W. Nibley and John R. Winder. Whether or not a counselor in the First Presidency is an ordained apostle, he is accepted by the church as a prophet, seer, and revelator.

Counselors are designated "First Counselor in the First Presidency" and "Second Counselor in the First Presidency," based on the order of being selected by the president. Additional counselors have been designated in different ways, including "Third Counselor in the First Presidency" (such as Hugh B. Brown), "Assistant Counselor to the President" (such as John Willard Young), and simply "Counselor in the First Presidency" (such as Thorpe B. Isaacson). The president and all his counselors constitute the First Presidency, which is the presiding quorum of the church. The next senior apostle to the president of the church is set apart by the president to be the President of the Quorum of the Twelve Apostles.

Removal

Though there has never been a popular movement in the church to have a president removed or punished, he could theoretically be removed from his position or otherwise disciplined by the Common Council of the Church. The only president of the church brought before the Common Council was Joseph Smith, who was tried for charges of misbehavior made against him by Sylvester Smith after the return of Zion's Camp in 1834. The Council determined that Joseph Smith had "acted in every respect in an honorable and proper manner with all monies and properties entrusted to his charge".

See also

 Assistant President of the Church
 We Thank Thee, O God, for a Prophet
 First Presidency (LDS Church)

Notes

References

Leadership positions in the Church of Jesus Christ of Latter-day Saints
 
1832 establishments in the United States
1832 in Christianity
LDS Church